Elvis Jacob Stahr Jr. (March 9, 1916 – November 11, 1998) was an American government official and college president and administrator.  After graduating from the University of Kentucky in 1936 as a member of Sigma Chi and Pershing Rifles, he attended Merton College at the University of Oxford on a Rhodes Scholarship. He served as lieutenant colonel in the U.S. Army during World War II. He returned to the University of Kentucky and became a professor and then dean of the College of Law, before becoming president of West Virginia University.  He served as the United States Secretary of the Army between 1961 and 1962 and served as president of Indiana University from 1962 to 1968.  He was the president of the National Audubon Society from 1968 until 1981.

Early life
Stahr was born in 1916 in Hickman, Kentucky to Hon. Elvis Stahr, a Fulton County, Kentucky judge and his wife Mary McDaniel Stahr. At age 16, he entered the University of Kentucky, where he achieved the highest academic average in the history of the university. He graduated Omicron Delta Kappa in 1936, and was a member of Sigma Chi and the National Society of Pershing Rifles, a Reserve Officer Training Corps fraternal organization. He attended Merton College, Oxford on a Rhodes Scholarship where he studied law. He was known at Oxford as "the Colonel" and resisted assuming British affectations. He practiced law in New York, then received a diploma in Chinese from Yale University. He served in combat units in China during World War II as a United States Army lieutenant colonel.

Early career
Stahr practiced law in New York after the war, and in 1946 married Dorothy Howland Berkfield, a New York City debutante. In 1947 he became a law professor at the University of Kentucky. He was named dean of the University of Kentucky College of Law and served until 1956. With University President and Justice Thurgood Marshall, he helped desegregate the law school. During the Korean War, he took a 16-month leave of absence to serve as special assistant to Secretary of the Army Frank Pace Jr. In 1956, Stahr was staff director of President Dwight D. Eisenhower's Commission on Education Beyond High School. He was vice chancellor at the University of Pittsburgh in 1957 and 1958, and then was president of West Virginia University until nominated as Secretary of the Army by President John F. Kennedy in 1961.

Secretary of the Army and President of Indiana University
Stahr served as Secretary of the Army in 1961 and 1962, during the Berlin crisis and the Central Intelligence Agency-sponsored Bay of Pigs invasion, aimed at ousting Fidel Castro from power. A major reorganization plan was launched; combat division structure was reorganized, special warfare forces community relations (Civic Action) were expanded, and the Army was strengthened during the Berlin Crisis. Stahr also mobilized the Alabama National Guard in 1961, when the Kennedy Administration undertook desegregating of the University of Alabama.
In 1962 Stahr resigned to become President of Indiana University.  He was the university's twelfth president. The Gary and Calumet campuses were combined to form IU Northwest, the joint IU-Purdue University campus was established in Fort Wayne, the School of Library and Information Science was founded, and the Herron School of Art in Indianapolis was affiliated with Indiana University.

Later career and life
Stahr retired from Indiana University in 1968, accepting the presidency of the National Audubon Society. Under Stahr's leadership, the Audubon Society undertook a campaign to increase its influence and membership, which in 10 years more than quadrupled to almost 400,000. As president of the Audubon Society, Stahr led efforts to preserve the Florida Everglades from commercial and industrial development, fought for accords on international whaling practices and campaigned successfully to liberalize U.S. tax laws to allow charitable organizations to lobby on public policy issues. He retired from Audubon in 1981. In the years following, he practiced law in Washington, D.C. and New York, lobbying for environmental issues. He had served on several corporate boards of directors, including Chase Manhattan Corp. and Acadia Mutual Life Insurance Co. In his life he earned more than 27 honorary degrees from various colleges and universities. He was also awarded Omicron Delta Kappa's highest honor in 1984, the Laurel Crowned Circle Award. He died of cancer in his Greenwich, Connecticut home on Veterans Day, November 11, 1998. Stahr and his wife Dorothy (1918–2005) are buried at Arlington National Cemetery.

References

External links
 Indiana University bio page on Stahr
 US Army biography of Stahr
 

1916 births
1998 deaths
Alumni of Merton College, Oxford
United States Army personnel of World War II
American Rhodes Scholars
Kentucky lawyers
People from Fulton County, Kentucky
Pershing Riflemen
United States Secretaries of the Army
University of Kentucky alumni
University of Kentucky faculty
Presidents of West Virginia University
Presidents of Indiana University
Burials at Arlington National Cemetery
20th-century American lawyers
United States Army colonels
20th-century American academics